Stuk or STUK may refer to:

 Radiation and Nuclear Safety Authority, the Finnish nuclear regulatory agency
 Stuk, a member of the Ukrainian hiphop group Glava 94
 "Stuk", a 2008 song by The Partysquad featuring Dio, Sef, Sjaak and Reverse

See also
 Stuck (disambiguation)
 STUC (disambiguation)